This list includes properties and districts listed on the National Register of Historic Places in Iredell County, North Carolina. Click the "Map of all coordinates" link to the right to view an online map of all properties and districts with latitude and longitude coordinates in the table below.

Current listings

|}

Note:  The datafiles for Iredell County in the NRHP have been moved to National Archives Catalog. Table search for 80002854 (Snow Creek Methodist Church and Burying Ground).

See also

National Register of Historic Places listings in North Carolina
List of National Historic Landmarks in North Carolina

References

Iredell County, North Carolina
Iredell County